

History
It used to be a native state of India in the Kathiawar Agency of the Bombay Presidency. Area, 289 sq. m.; pop. (1901), 52,856, showing a decrease of 15% in the decade.  Gross revenue, £42,000; tribute jointly to the Gaekwar of Baroda and the Nawab of Junagadh, £700. The capital of the state, Palitana, had a population of 12,800.
Its ruler enjoyed a 9-guns salute.

Rulers
The rulers bore the title of Thakur Sahib.

See also
Political integration of India
Baroda, Western India and Gujarat States Agency

References

Kathiawar Agency
States and territories established in 1194
States and territories disestablished in 1948
Princely states of Gujarat
Rajputs
Gohils
1194 establishments in Asia
1948 disestablishments in India
12th-century establishments in India